The  Canada’s Cup is a silver trophy, deeded in perpetuity in 1896,  to be awarded to the winner of a series of match races between a yacht representing a Canadian yacht club and one representing an American yacht club, both to be located on the Great Lakes.

The Cup matches were intended to be a test of the challenger’s and the defender’s abilities to design and build a yacht to the prevailing measurement rule, and to sail that yacht to victory.  In a departure from the original goal of the Cup to encourage racing yacht design the  2001-2011 Cup challenge races were  sailed in the Farr 40,  and subsequently in the 2021 and 2022 Cup challenges in the Melges IC37,  both  one-design class yachts.

The Cup is a unique trophy, approximately 30 cm (12 inches) high excluding base, specifically crafted for a cross-border sailing competition in 1896, and is an engraved bowl, gilt inside, whose richly embellished supporting pedestal depicts a lion (symbolising the British Empire of which Canada was a part at that time) and an eagle (symbolising the American Republic).

Origin

In 1895, the Lincoln Park Yacht Club of Chicago challenged the Royal Canadian Yacht Club of Toronto (RCYC) to a series of races, to be held on “neutral” waters in the summer of 1896. As yacht racing was then a popular spectator sport, several cities competed to have the competition held in their waters; the winner was Toledo, Ohio, which put up a silver trophy made by Tiffany & Co. along with a cash prize of $1,500 (over $31,000 in 2012 purchasing power) – a customary practice in those days.

The American yacht, Vencedor, already in build at the time of the challenge, was a 63-foot cutter drawn by Thorwald S. Poekel, the former chief draughtsman at the renowned Herreshoff Manufacturing Company. The Canadian response was a 57-foot cutter designed by William Fife and named Canada. In the summer of 1896, both yachts sailed in company to Toledo, racing against other yachts along the way and building excitement along their respective voyages.

Canada won the first race in moderate weather. The following day brought high winds and rain; not wanting to expose a prized mainsail to high wind and rain, Vencedor's skipper asked for a lay day. Realizing how disadvantaged his vessel would be in heavy weather, Canada's skipper, Aemilius Jarvis, agreed to the postponement. The following day, the weather moderated and Canada took the series with two straight wins, collecting the cash and the trophy.

Jarvis and his syndicate then deeded the Cup to RCYC “as a perpetual challenge cup for friendly competition between representatives of yacht clubs of the two nations bordering on the Great Lakes.” Jarvis would sail for the Cup four more times, as defender and challenger before relinquishing the helm to another RCYC member.

Conditions For Competition

A challenge must be cross-border (a US club may not challenge a US club nor a Canadian club another Canadian club), but other than that restriction, any yacht club on the Great Lakes may issue a challenge to the current holder. Once the challenge has been accepted, the defending club must select a defender from within the club. The challenger, however, must open its selection to any yacht from its own side of the border. In some years, the result has been an intense round of races on both sides to select the boats for the final series.

In theory, choice of the type of yacht is the sole prerogative of the challenger; in practice, it is the subject of negotiation, not only to accord with the current appreciation of what constitutes an appropriate vessel for competition at this level, but to leaven the considerable expense with a design that would have a respectable service life after the contest. Accordingly, yachts have been designed to whatever leading-edge but acceptably stable rating rule was in force at the time. Canada and Vencedor were designed to the Seawanhaka rule. Subsequent vessels have been built to the Universal Rule, Girth Rule, The International Rule and Cruising Club of America Rule, then the International Offshore Rule and MORC.

One Design vs Development Class

From 2001 until 2011, the Farr 40 one-design yacht was used. Choice of this design not only assured owners of having a useful boat at the end of the series, it had the effect of focussing the competition on crew and tactical skills.

For the 2016 challenge, the committee decided against one design yachts and reverted to the original approach of one off yachts built to a design standard/rule. The 8-Metre yacht an International Rule type class,  used in the 1930, 1932, and 1934 challenges and last sailed in the 1954 Canada's Cup, was chosen. Three boats sailed for the right to challenge and three boats sailed to be chosen as defender for the 2016 Cup. The 2016 8-Metre World Championship held in Toronto three weeks before the 2016 Canada's Cup competition helped generate significant media interest for both events.

For the 2020 challenge the Canada’s Cup Committee selected the Melges IC37,  a strict one-design class,  for the 2020, 2022 and 2024 Canada's Cup events.  The 2020 Canada's Cup event was cancelled due to the Covid 19 epidemic and deferred to 2021 when it was held at the Royal Canadian Yacht Club.

Competitors

 Merged with Chicago Yacht Club, 1920

References

External links
sailingscuttlebutt.com: "Scuttlebutt News: When Canvas was King - by Robert B. Townsend - A History of the Canada's Cup"
sailingscuttlebutt.com: "Canada's Cup History"

External links

Match racing competitions
Recurring events established in 1896
Yachting races